SpongeBob SquarePants: SuperSponge is a 2001 2.5D platform game developed by Climax Development and published by THQ. The game is based on the Nickelodeon cartoon series of the same name. It was released for the PlayStation on September 20, 2001 and for the Game Boy Advance on November 8, 2001. The Game Boy Advance version was also released on a Twin Pack cartridge bundled with SpongeBob SquarePants: Revenge of the Flying Dutchman and a Triple Pack cartridge bundled with Tak and the Power of Juju and Rugrats: I Gotta Go Party in 2005.

It is the second SpongeBob game released on PlayStation, after Nicktoons Racing, which features SpongeBob, Patrick, and Plankton as playable characters. The PlayStation version of SuperSponge sold 1.06 million copies, becoming one of the console's best-selling games. The game was later reissued for the PlayStation as a Greatest Hits title.

The source code and most of the development assets for the PlayStation version were sold on two DVDs, and the contents were released on the Internet Archive in 2016. Early source code for the Game Boy Advance version was later found and released in 2019 as well.

Gameplay
The game is divided in five worlds (listed as "chapters"): Bikini Bottom, The Center of the Earth (an underwater volcano), Prehistoric Bikini Bottom, Rock Bottom, and Industrial (the industrial district of Bikini Bottom). Each world is divided into four levels, which are cleared by collecting the object desired by Barnacle Boy. In addition, the fourth level of every chapter has a boss enemy who must be defeated to progress.

Scattered through all the levels there are spatulas. By collecting all 100 in a level, SpongeBob earns an extra life. In the PlayStation version, spatulas serve as Sonic the Hedgehog-style health measures for the player. If SpongeBob is touched by an enemy, he loses all of the collected spatulas, and if he is touched by an enemy without any spatulas, he loses a life. In the PlayStation version, there is a continue feature that features Patrick at SpongeBob's house all alone; he encourages the player to keep going on SpongeBob's quest by saying where are his friends, and thinking they forgot his birthday. In the Game Boy Advance version, a separate health measure is used, which can be replenished by collecting items like Salty Fries, Salty Shakes, and Krabby Patties. Lives also can be obtained by finding underpants.

In the PlayStation version, by collecting a certain number of spatulas in every chapter, a secret level named "Six Clams Adventure Land" (a reference to the Six Flags amusement park) can be unlocked. In those levels, set in an amusement park, SpongeBob must ride through obstacles and collect all 25 flower tokens. These tokens can be used to buy props for Patrick's birthday party at the end of the game.

Plot
It is Patrick's birthday, and SpongeBob wants to give him "the best present ever": a photo signed by his favorite superheroes, Mermaid Man and Barnacle Boy. However, the heroes want nothing more than to get rid of SpongeBob, so they keep sending him to accomplish random tasks around Bikini Bottom. After returning from one such task, SpongeBob discovers that the television in Mermaid Man and Barnacle Boy's retirement home is broken, so he searches Bikini Bottom for repair tools. After finding the tools, SpongeBob returns to fix the television. Mermaid Man and Barnacle Boy, feeling grateful, finally give SpongeBob the autographs. The game ends with Patrick thanking SpongeBob for the autographs, and everyone wishing him a happy birthday.

Reception

SpongeBob SquarePants: SuperSponge received mixed reviews since its release. The PlayStation's version received 68% and the Game Boy Advance version a 67.83% on GameRankings. The PlayStation version of this game also received the title of "Greatest Hits".

References

External links
 SpongeBob SquarePants: SuperSponge at GameFAQs
 SpongeBob SquarePants: SuperSponge at Giant Bomb
 SpongeBob SquarePants: SuperSponge (PS1) at MobyGames
 SpongeBob SquarePants: SuperSponge (GBA) at MobyGames

2001 video games
Game Boy Advance games
Platform games
PlayStation (console) games
SuperSponge
THQ games
Video games developed in the United Kingdom
Video games scored by Matthew Simmonds
Video games with 2.5D graphics
Climax Group games